The diving competitions at the 2019 Pan American Games in Lima took place from August 1 to 5, 2019 at the  Aquatics Centre. It was one of four aquatic sports at the Games, along with swimming, water polo, and artistic swimming.

The games featured competitions in ten events (men and women events each of): 1m springboard, 3m springboard, synchronised 3m springboard, 10m platform, and synchronised 10m platform. The 1m springboard events returned to the program.

The winner of each individual 3m and 10m event (if not already qualified) qualified for the 2020 Summer Olympics in Tokyo, Japan.

Medal summary

Medal table

Medalists

Men's Events

Women's Events

See also
Diving at the 2018 Asian Games
Diving at the 2020 Summer Olympics

References

External links
Results book

Diving at the 2019 Pan American Games
Events at the 2019 Pan American Games
2019
2019 in diving
Diving competitions in Peru
International aquatics competitions hosted by Peru